Psychonoctua personalis is a moth in the family Cossidae. It was described by Augustus Radcliffe Grote in 1865. It is found on Cuba, Jamaica, Hispaniola and Puerto Rico.

Subspecies
Psychonoctua personalis personalis
Psychonoctua personalis jamaicensis (Schaus, 1901) (Jamaica)
Psychonoctua personalis lillianae Lindsey, 1926 (Antigua)
Psychonoctua personalis muricolora (Dyar, 1937) (Puerto Rico)

References

Zeuzerinae
Moths described in 1865